Wenceslaus Paprocki (1585–1638) was a Roman Catholic prelate who served as Auxiliary Bishop of Włocławek (1634–1638) and Titular Bishop of Margarita (1634–1638).

Biography
Krzysztof Charbicki was born in 1585.
On 17 Dec 1634, he was appointed during the papacy of Pope Urban VIII as Auxiliary Bishop of Włocławek and Titular Bishop of Margarita.
On 12 Aug 1635, he was consecrated bishop by Maciej Łubieński, Bishop of Włocławek, with Stanisław Łubieński, Bishop of Płock, and Stanislaw Starczewski, Titular Bishop of Lacedaemonia. 
He served as Bishop of Włocławek until his death on 22 Jun 1638.

References

External links and additional sources
 (for Chronology of Bishops) 
 (for Chronology of Bishops)  
 (for Chronology of Bishops) 
 (for Chronology of Bishops)  

17th-century Roman Catholic bishops in the Polish–Lithuanian Commonwealth
Bishops appointed by Pope Urban VIII
1585 births
1638 deaths